JR Reed (born December 13, 1967, as Jason William Reed) is an American character actor and singer, originally from Corvallis, Oregon. He is best known for his roles as "Lee" with American rock band Tenacious D, mainly in their television series and in their 2006 film The Pick of Destiny, as well as featuring at live concerts. He would also form the band Trainwreck with Kyle Gass in 2002 alongside Tenacious D guitarist Kyle Gass, performing as the lead singer. Trainwreck broke up in 2010, though reformed in 2018. Outside of these appearances, Reed mainly features in sporadic television, web-series and film appearances, as well as in commercial work.

Early and personal life 
Reed was born in Corvallis, Oregon, though grew up in Las Vegas, where he graduated from Bonanza High School. He moved to L.A after graduating, where currently lives  and worked as a handyman, before attending UCLA School of Theater, Film and Television.

Career

Acting and music 
Reed enrolled in the UCLA School of Theater, Film and Television in 1987 and graduated in 1991. He joined Tim Robbins' The Actors' Gang and his first production with the group was the Good Woman of Setzuan. JR met Kyle Gass and knew Jack Black from UCLA previously, which led him to getting hired as a roadie and playing Spider-Man at early Tenacious D concerts. In 1996, Reed starred in his first film, The Shot. His Actors' Gang production "Kick Ass Militia" won the Backstage West Play Production of the Year award in 1997. In 1999, JR starred in Buffy the Vampire Slayer and in 2000 featured in Tenacious D's TV series as "Lee". In 2001, Reed made appearances in Dead Last and The Anniversary Party. In 2002, JR started a side-project band with Gass called Trainwreck with Kyle Gass. He can also be seen on The Complete Masterworks Tenacious D concert DVD.

In 2005, Reed featured in a television special of Alias as well as having a part in Living with Fran. In 2006, Reed featured in Tenacious D in the Pick of Destiny, taking on the role of Lee, and played the "Time Goblin" in the 2006 short film Tenacious D: Time Fixers. He also went on the world tour to support the album as "Satan" and "The Metal" amongst other roles, he would continue these roles at summer festivals a couple of years later, such as Reading and Leeds festivals 2008 and Outside Lands in 2009. He can be seen on The Complete Masterworks Part 2. In late 2009, Reed featured in the viral thanksgiving video, "The Sexy Pilgrim" and in 2010 Reed featured in Remington's "Keep It Hairy". In 2013, Reed featured as the lead role in "Campus Security", an Internet series, as well as featuring in an episode of Community. In 2014, Reed featured in Nickelodeon's Henry Danger. In 2015, he made his international film debut in the Danish film Klown Forever as himself and the Battle Cat. In the fall of 2015, Reed's signature "The Metal" costume, used on the 2006–2007 world tour, was put on auction by Tenacious D in support of Josh Homme's Sweet Stuff Foundation, to raise funds for the victims and families of the November 2015 Paris attacks. In 2016, Reed featured in Black-ish as a substitute teacher.

Commercial work 
Reed's career includes commercial work for Time Warner, Microsoft, TiVO, Carl's Jr, Hardee's, Taco Bell, Silk Soy Milk, Tanqueray, Volkswagen, Planter's Nuts and Castrol Motor Oil. His most notable lead role in McDonald's "The Fish Is Back" Filet-O-Fish commercial went viral in between 2008 and 2010. He has also featured in Remington's "Keep it Hairy" and in Muscle Milk's "The Sexy Pilgrim" music videos, both of which feature Reed as the lead role. More recently, Reed featured in a commercial for hotels.com. In 2015, Reed featured in commercials for Rite Aid promoting flu treatment.

Appearances

Film

Television and web series

References

External links 
 

1967 births
Living people
American male television actors
People from Corvallis, Oregon
Trainwreck with Kyle Gass members